Acanthina, common name the unicorn snails, is a genus of small predatory sea snails, marine gastropod mollusks in the family Muricidae, the murex snails or rock snails.

Habitat
These snails live in the intertidal zone.

Species
Species within the genus Acanthina:
 Acanthina monodon (Pallas, 1774)
 Acanthina unicornis (Bruguière, 1789)

 Species brought into synonymy 

 Acanthina paucilirata now Acanthinucella paucilirata
 Acanthina punctulata  now Acanthinucella punctulata
 Acanthina lugubris  now Mexacanthina lugubris
 Acanthina spirata now  Acanthinucella spirata
 Acanthina angelica Oldroyd, 1918 : synonym of Mexacanthina angelica (Oldroyd, 1918)
 Acanthina costata Fischer, 1807 : synonym of  Acanthina monodon (Pallas, 1774)
 Acanthina imbricata Fischer, 1807 : synonym of Acanthina monodon (Pallas, 1774)
 Acanthina laevigata Fischer, 1807 : synonym of  Acanthina monodon (Pallas, 1774)
 Acanthina tyrianthina Berry, 1957 : synonym of  Mexacanthina lugubris (Sowerby, 1821)

References

 McLean, James H., 1978 ‘’Marine Shells of Southern California’’, Natural History Museum of Los Angeles County Museum, Science Series 24, Revised Edition: 1-104

External links

Ocenebrinae